Richard Henry Nigl is perhaps best known for a series of performances generally characterized as "Shout Art". Nigl created these works improvisationally in the late 1970s.

Career
These "Shouts" consist of quasi-poetic performances typically ending in a startling shouted word or phrase. The general format of "Shouts" addresses a lineage with Dadaism and Futurism. Since 1961, in addition to performances and site specific installations and work within traditional media, his recent work has focused on digital imaging and the internet as an environment for art.

See also
 The Art of Noises (L'arte dei Rumori), Luigi Russolo The Art of Noises

References

 Maine Art Now, Edgar Allen Beem, Dog Ear Press, Review of 1974 Maine Biennial, University of Southern Maine, Gorham

External links
 UBUWeb Sound
 Artist's Website R. Henry Nigl Works
 R Henry Nigl, Facebook Digital Work and Archives 

American performance artists
Living people
1944 births